Sicignano is an Italian habitational surname from Sicignano degli Alburni.

Etymology
Sicignano is the Modern Italian descendant of the cognomen Sicinianus.

Possible Latin forms include, in the nominative:
"Sicinius", masculine singular
Sicinia, feminine singular
Sicinii, masculine plural
Siciniae, feminine plural
Sicinianus, masculine adoptive
Siciniana, feminine adoptive

Sicinia + anus = Sicinianus --> Sicignano

People 
Vincenzo Sicignano (b. 1974), Italian football player

References 
 www.ancestry.com
 http://sicignanodeglialburni.asmenet.it

Footnotes

External links

 The Sicignano Family
 Sicignano degli Alburni official website
 Sicignano degli Alburni on paesionline.it

Italian-language surnames